Laura Ritchie (born November 1973, in the United States) is a cellist and Professor of Learning and Teaching in Music at the University of Chichester, where she is leads the Music with Teaching (Instrumental / Vocal) and MA Performance Programmes, and an annual Cello Weekend. In 2012 she was awarded a National Teaching Fellowship from the Higher Education Academy. She has published two books: Fostering Self-efficacy in Higher Education Students and California Dreaming.

Laura Ritchie studied cello in America with Hans Jørgen Jensen and in London with Steven Doane. She is a member of the Brighton-based band The Mummers.

References

External links
 Laura Ritchie

1973 births
Living people
Academics of the University of Chichester
American cellists
Women cellists
21st-century American women musicians
American women academics
21st-century cellists